Margaret McDonald Bottome (McDonald; December 29, 1827 – November 14, 1906) was an American reformer, organizational founder, and author. She was engaged in religious work in Brooklyn, and for more than a quarter of a century, she gave Bible talks to the society women of New York City. Out of these experiences grew the order of the King's Daughters, which she founded and for which she was annually chosen president until her death. She was the author of several books, made a large number of contributions to religious magazines.

Early life and education
Margaret McDonald was born in New York City, December 29, 1827. Her parents, William and Mary (Willis) McDonald, were of Scottish ancestry. She was the oldest of 18 siblings.

McDonald lived in Brooklyn from her childhood. She received her education at Prof. Greenleaf's School for Girls, Brooklyn Heights.

Early in life, she became interested in religious and charitable work in Brooklyn where her father held a municipal position. She accompanied him weekly to the almshouse and prison, and systematically visited the sick and poor of the Brooklyn districts. Influenced by these impressions, she developed strong religious and charitable sentiments. The influence of the home culminated in the conversion of Margaret at Sand Street Church, at the age of 12.

Career
In 1850, she married Rev. Francis ("Frank") Bottome, an itinerant preacher of the Methodist Episcopal Church. About 1876, she commenced giving Bible talks in drawing-rooms to society women of New York City and continued this practice for more than 25 years. Francis was a native of England, who had served in the local ministry in that country and had migrated to Canada, where on an immense circuit, he preached to the Native Americans until his health declined, after which he came to New York City.

When Rev. Bottome was a pastor in the wealthy suburb of Tarrytown, New York, some of the summer residents heard of the talks Margaret was giving to a class which she led, and they came to listen to her. After that, for more than a quarter of a century, she lectured on the topic of "Bible Talks" in the drawing rooms and salons of wealthy women; it was her most effective personal work. In 1878, Rev. Bottome was thrown from his horse and killed. Instead of his death putting an end to Margaret's activities, it spurred her on to continue in religious work. The couple had four sons. One of them, who became a physician, died young. Two sons became ministers, Rev. W. M. Bottome and Rev. George H. Bottome. The fourth, Harry H. Bottome, became a lawyer.

On January 13, 1886, with nine other women, Bottome organized the first "ten" of the order of the King's Daughters, the name being suggested by Mrs. William Irving, a New York educator, basing the system on Edward Everett Hale's Ten Times One is Ten. Till her death, Bottome was annually chosen president.

In 1896, she was elected and accepted the additional responsibility of the presidency of the Woman's branch of the International Medical Missionary Society. Securing Bottome as president, many other women joined.

Bottome served as associate editor of the Ladies' Home Journal, having regularly contributed since 1889 a department article called "Heart to Heart Talks with the King's Daughters", and she also wrote for various other periodicals, mainly religious publications. Bottome wrote some pamphlets. Among her other published works are Crumbs from the King's Table, A Sunshine Trip to the Orient,  Death and Life, and Seven Questions After Easter. Some of Bottome's lectures, her "Bible Talks" , were published first in the Silver Cross Magazine, the organ of the King's Daughters, and later in book form, under the title of The Guest Chamber (New York, 1893).

Death and legacy
After being ill for some time, Bottome died at her home in New York City, November 14, 1906. The Margaret Bottome Memorial, The King's Daughter's House in Harlem (incorporated, 1907), was located at 344 East 124th Street, New York City. It focused upon settlement lines in the Upper East Side districts, and maintained a sewing school, clubs, classes, and fresh-air work.

Selected works

 Death and Life
 Seven Questions After Easter
 The Guest Chamber, 1893
 Crumbs from the King's Table, 1888
 A Sunshine Trip - Glimpses of the Orient, 1897
 Heart to heart letters, 1909

References

Attribution

External links
 

1827 births
1906 deaths
People from New York City
American social reformers
19th-century American non-fiction writers
19th-century American women writers
20th-century American non-fiction writers
20th-century American women writers
Women founders
American founders
Organization founders
Religious writers
19th-century travel writers
American women travel writers
American travel writers
International Order of the King's Daughters and Sons